Yannick Marchand (born 15 August 1988) is a Belgian retired footballer.

External links 

1988 births
Living people
Belgian footballers
K.A.A. Gent players
S.V. Zulte Waregem players
F.C.V. Dender E.H. players
K.S.K. Ronse players
Association football defenders